Compañía Panameña de Aviación, S.A., (commonly referred to as Copa and branded simply as "Copa Airlines") is the flag carrier of Panama. It is headquartered in Panama City, Panama, with its main hub at Tocumen International Airport. Copa is a subsidiary of Copa Holdings, S.A. as well as a member of Star Alliance. The airline is also the main operator and owner of Colombian airline AeroRepública, currently known as Wingo, previously known as Copa Airlines Colombia.

Copa was founded in 1947 and it began domestic operations to three cities in Panama shortly afterwards. The airline then abandoned its domestic flights in 1980, in favor of international flights. In 1998, Copa formed a partnership with Continental Airlines, adopting a new brand image and the OnePass frequent flyer program and later replaced by MileagePlus, which was replaced by ConnectMiles in July 2015.

History

Inauguration 
The airline was established as Compañía Panameña de Aviación (hence the acronym COPA) on June 21, 1944, and started operations on August 15, 1947. It was founded by a group of prominent Panamanian investors with assistance from Pan American World Airways, who took a 32% stake. It began operating domestic flights with a small fleet of Douglas DC-3 aircraft. The airline started its first international flights in the early 1970s, with services to cities in Jamaica, Colombia, and Costa Rica. Turboprop aircraft operated by Copa included the Hawker Siddeley HS 748 and Lockheed L-188 Electra.

Until the early 1980s, the airline had significant competition from Air Panamá Internacional, which had a higher profile. Copa discontinued domestic flights in 1980 and acquired its first jet, a Boeing 737-100. Today the airline operates flights to a number of destinations in the U.S. and Canada including Atlanta (ATL),  Boston (BOS), Chicago (ORD), Denver (DEN), Fort Lauderdale (FLL), Las Vegas (LAS), Los Angeles (LAX), Miami (MIA), Montreal (YUL), New York City (JFK), Orlando (MCO), San Francisco (SFO), Tampa (TPA), Toronto (YYZ), and Washington, D.C. (IAD) as well as to other destinations in the Caribbean and Latin America. As of 2022, the airline has an all-Boeing 737 fleet.

Expansion years 

Expansion continued during the 1990s, when it began service to Buenos Aires, Argentina; Santiago, Chile; Bogotá, Colombia; Havana, Cuba; Guayaquil, Ecuador; Lima, Peru; Mexico City, Mexico; Caracas, Venezuela; and many other important Latin American cities.

In 1992 Copa Airlines signed a strategic alliance with TACA Airlines (now Avianca El Salvador), and the airline began flying from Tocumen International Airport, making it the first flight connection center in Latin America. As a result, Tocumen was dubbed as the “Hub of the Americas” and several Latin American airlines such as LACSA of Costa Rica, Aviateca of Guatemala, and NICA of Nicaragua joined the alliance. The alliance ended in 1998 when the six-year agreement expired.

In 1998 Continental Airlines acquired 49% of the airline, marking the beginning of a comprehensive marketing and operating alliance. On May 19, 1999, Continental increased its stake to 51%. Since then, Copa has adopted a livery and corporate logo similar to Continental's (now United). Copa participated in the OnePass frequent flyer program until Continental's merger with United Airlines. In connection with the initial public offering in December 2005, Continental reduced its stake to approximately 27.3% and through a follow-on offering in 2006, further reduced it to approximately 10%.

In 2000, Copa Airlines inaugurated service to Los Angeles, Cancún, and Orlando, as well as to São Paulo; in 2001, it began service to Quito, Ecuador. In 2004, it began service to John F. Kennedy International Airport in New York City. Copa also announced in August of that year a codeshare agreement with Mexico's Mexicana de Aviación, which lasted until 2007.

On June 1, 2005, Copa Airlines acquired 90% of the Colombian domestic air carrier AeroRepública, having earlier announced a codeshare plan with the carrier. Copa rebranded AeroRepública to Copa Airlines Colombia in 2010, increased destinations and modernized the fleet. On December 15, 2005, parent company Copa Holdings, S.A., launched an IPO of 14 million shares on the New York Stock Exchange thus becoming the fourth Latin American airline to be traded on the exchange, after LAN Airlines of Chile and Brazilian carriers Gol Transportes Aéreos and TAM Airlines.

In 2006, Copa Airlines began service to six new destinations: Manaus, Brazil; Maracaibo, Venezuela;
Montevideo, Uruguay; Rio de Janeiro, Brazil; San Pedro Sula, Honduras; and Santiago de los Caballeros, Dominican Republic. In addition, Copa Airlines took delivery of six Embraer 190s and two Boeing 737s. In 2007, Copa Airlines added services to Córdoba, Argentina; Guadalajara, Mexico; Punta Cana, Dominican Republic; and Washington, D.C. Copa Airlines added four Embraer 190s and two Boeing 737s (-800 series). That same year, the airline joined the SkyTeam alliance as an associate member.

During 2008, Copa Airlines added five new destinations and received four Embraer 190s and one Boeing 737-800. The new destinations are Port of Spain, Trinidad and Tobago; Belo Horizonte, Brazil; Valencia, Venezuela; Oranjestad, Aruba; and Santa Cruz de la Sierra, Bolivia. In May 2008, Continental Airlines sold its remaining 4.38 million shares of Copa Airlines for $35.75 a share, yielding a net profit of approximately $149.8 million.

That same year, Copa Airlines' CEO Pedro Heilbron announced on the ALTA airline leaders forum in Cancún that the airline had decided to leave SkyTeam and were in exclusive talks with Star Alliance.

In 2009, Copa Airlines announced it would withdraw from SkyTeam on October 24, the same date that partner Continental Airlines left the alliance. The company added two Boeing 737-800s. and announced a firm order for 13 Boeing 737-800s with the new Boeing signature "Sky Interior".

In 2010, Copa Airlines began service to St. Maarten, received nine Boeing 737-800s and announced that it would join Star Alliance in mid-2012 to rejoin old partner Continental Airlines (now United). That same year, Copa Airlines announced a firm order to purchase 32 Boeing 737-800 planes valued at $1.7 billion, thus becoming the largest plane order in the airline's history. The Boeing 737-800 are set for delivery between 2015 and 2018, with an option to acquire ten additional 737-800 aircraft.

In 2011, Copa Airlines began service to Toronto; Brasilia and Porto Alegre, Brazil; Chicago; Cúcuta, Colombia; Montego Bay, Jamaica; Monterrey, Mexico and Asunción, Paraguay; and Nassau, The Bahamas. It also passed from a four bank hub to a six bank hub and increased frequencies to several destinations.

That same year, Copa Airlines launched a mobile version of its website, giving passengers the chance to get a mobile pass and check flight status and other services. Additionally, the airline announced a new codeshare agreement with TAME, which became effective in January 2012. Copa Airlines also became the first airline in Latin America to have the new Boeing 737-800NG Sky Interior with improved performance in its fleet.

In 2012, the company announced five new destinations: Las Vegas, United States; Recife, Brazil; Willemstad, Curaçao; Liberia, Costa Rica; and Iquitos, Peru. In June of the same year, Copa Airlines became an official member of Star Alliance along with AviancaTaca.

Copa also increased flight frequencies to several destinations and inaugurated an interline agreement with Air Panama (Panama's second-largest airline) which consists of the linkage of all tourist destinations in Panama with those in Latin America. The agreement became effective June 1, 2012, when Air Panama began flights from Tocumen airport to Isla Colón, Bocas del Toro.

In 2013, Copa increased the frequency to several destinations and included two new destinations in the United States: Boston and Tampa.

Aviation Partners Boeing (APB) announced on 10 October 2013, that Copa Airlines placed an order to retrofit some of its existing Boeing Next Generation 737s' blended winglets with APB's new split scimitar winglets, as part of its environmental strategy. The new APB winglet technology will save Copa more than $21 million in jet fuel costs fleetwide and more than 63,000 tons of carbon dioxide  outputs per year.

In January 2014, Copa Airlines announced three new destinations and revealed its business strategy for the year, which included the delivery of eight new Boeing 737-800 aircraft and the increase of flight frequencies to some destinations. The new destinations are Montreal, Canada; Fort Lauderdale, United States and Georgetown, Guyana. In July, it added Campinas, Brazil; and Santa Clara, Cuba. In April 2014, Copa Airlines became the first airline in Latin America and the third in the world to implement the Split Scimitar Winglets on its Boeing 737 NG fleet.

In January 2015, the airline achieved a milestone in its history when it re-launched daily domestic flights to David, Chiriquí, the first ones since the closure of the route three decades earlier. Also, Copa Airlines announced new flights to Villahermosa and Puebla, Mexico; and New Orleans, United States. Three months later, the airline announced another new destination In the U.S: San Francisco, California, United States. In July 2015, Copa Airlines announced service to Belize City which began in December 2015.

In April 2015, the airline announced an order for 61 Boeing 737 MAX 8/9 aircraft worth $6.6 billion at list price.

On June 21, 2016, the airline started flights to Holguín. On June 28, 2016, the airline started flights to Chiclayo. On July 1, 2016, the airline started flights to Rosario.

In December 2016, Wingo, a Colombia based low cost airline owned by Copa, began operations.

On November 15, 2017, the airline started flights to Mendoza, Argentina. On December 11, 2017, the airline started flights to Denver, United States.

On January 29, 2018, Copa Airlines announced that it would start flights to Bridgetown, Barbados on July 17, 2018; Fortaleza, Brazil on July 18, 2018; and Salvador da Bahia, Brazil on July 24, 2018.

On December 12, 2018, the airline started flights to Salta, Argentina. On December 16, 2018, the airline started flights to Puerto Vallarta, Mexico.

On January 17, 2019, the airline announced flights to Paramaribo, Suriname; which commenced on July 6, 2019.

On December 2, 2021, the airline started flights to Armenia, Colombia. On December 6, 2021, the airline restarted flights to Cúcuta, Colombia. On December 12, 2021, the airline started flights to Atlanta, United States.

Destinations 

Copa Airlines currently flies to 75 destinations in 30 countries in North America, Central America, South America, and the Caribbean.

Codeshare agreements
Copa Airlines codeshares with the following airlines:

 Air Europa
 Air France
 Asiana Airlines
 Avianca
 Azul Brazilian Airlines
 Emirates
 EVA Air
 Gol Transportes Aéreos
 Iberia
 KLM
 Lufthansa
 Turkish Airlines
 United Airlines

Fleet

Current fleet
, the Copa Airlines fleet consists of the following Boeing aircraft:

Fleet development

Copa Airlines was the first Latin American customer of the Embraer 190. The airline also operated the longest scheduled Boeing 737-700 flight in the world between Panama City and Montevideo, Uruguay, until it was overtaken by Scandinavian Airlines's Stavanger to Houston service. The route regained the title when the SAS service closed in October 2015.
In October 2004, Copa Airlines announced an order to purchase ten Embraer 190 aircraft with options for an additional 20 aircraft. Later orders were increased by exercising five options. Six aircraft were delivered in the first quarter of 2007.
In May 2007, the airline made firm commitments to purchase four Boeing 737-800 and ten Embraer E-190, representing an investment of approximately $1.1 billion.
On 16 July 2009, the airline announced an order for 13 Boeing 737-800 aircraft that came with the new Boeing's signature "Sky Interior".
In November 2010, Copa and Boeing announced the purchase of 22 Boeing 737-800 planes, set for delivery between 2015 and 2018, with an option to acquire ten more Boeing 737-800, valued approximately at $1.7 billion. This was the largest plane order in Copa Airlines history until the purchase of 61 Boeing 737 MAX aircraft in April 2015, valued approximately at $6.6 billion.
In April 2013, Copa Airlines received from Boeing the first of the Next-Generation 737s (A Boeing 737-800, registration HP-1831CMP) produced at High Production Rate.
In April 2014, the carrier received its first Boeing 737-800 (registration HP-1836CMP) with Split Scimitar winglets and expects to retrofit all the Boeing 737s with the new winglets.
In 2012, Copa showed interest in acquiring the re-engineered Boeing 737 MAX family. In April 2015, the airline placed a firm order for 61 Boeing 737 MAX-8 and MAX-9 aircraft. The number of aircraft for each variant has yet to be published.
In November 2015, Copa Airlines announced the gradual retirement of the Embraer 190 fleet, in favor of the Boeing 737s. One was sold in late 2019, and the remaining 14 were sold to Australia's Alliance Airlines in 2020.

Former fleet
Copa Airlines formerly operated the following aircraft:

Liveries 

Since its founding in 1947, Copa Airlines used several liveries during the update of its fleet from turboprops to jetliners. Also, it has special liveries within its fleet. In November 2003, in honor of the 100th anniversary of the Republic of Panama, Copa Airlines adorned its fleet of Boeing 737-700s with a special livery depicting the official centennial logo and portrait of the first president of Panama, Manuel Amador Guerrero.

In 2006, a Copa Airlines Embraer 190 sported a special livery denoting it was the 200th Embraer 190 produced by the Brazilian plane manufacturer Embraer.

On 3 February 2011, the Tourism Authority of Panama worked alongside Copa Airlines to create a special livery for a Boeing 737-800 (registered HP-1534CMP) depicting a butterfly logo of Panama and the URL "visitpanama.com". This was part of an effort to promote tourism in Panama. As of 2013, the plane no longer has the logo on the left forward side.

On 6 March 2012, a new Copa Airlines Boeing 737-800 (registered HP-1728CMP) carried the Star Alliance livery. Also, it introduced a redesigned font style in the Copa Airlines' logo. This plane was inactive until 21 June, when it was exhibited in the celebration of the company's official integration to Star Alliance. The aircraft began service six days later, making the first scheduled non-stop passenger flight from Panama to Las Vegas. On 30 May 2012, another new Boeing 737-800 (registered HP-1823CMP) received the Star Alliance livery.

Copa received a new Boeing 737-800 (registered HP-1825CMP, shown at the right) in October 2012, sporting a livery depicting Frank Gehry's Biomuseo, a museum that opened in Panama City in October 2013.

In March 2013, a newly built Boeing 737-800 for Copa Airlines (registered HP-1830CMP) was painted with the Star Alliance livery scheme. This was the third aircraft in the fleet with the former Star Alliance livery.

In August 2014, Copa Airlines worked with the Panama Canal Authority to launch a special campaign in honor of the 100th anniversary of the Panama Canal. The campaign included the implementation of a special livery, which has a graphic image of the locks, on the back of two Boeing 737-800 aircraft and is expected to be implemented on more than 40 aircraft of the fleet.

From 1947 to present, Copa Airlines has used the following liveries:
 Compañia Panameña de Aviación (1947–1961)
 Vuele Copa (1961–1965)
 Copa Panama (original) - White fuselage with a red or green cheatline (1965–1971) 
 Copa Panama (1st upgrade) - Red and orange cheatline with white fuselage (1971–1980)
 Copa Panama (2nd upgrade) - Red and yellow cheatline with white fuselage (1980–1990)
 Copa "Billboard Style" - Red and yellow cheatline with white fuselage, and "Copa" logo in the front part of the widebody and tail (1990–1999)
 Copa Airlines - white and gray fuselage, with gold cheatline in the middle, and the well-known globe logo (1999–present)

The white and gray livery has been used by Copa Airlines since 1999, after Continental raised its ownership of the company to 51% in that year. Although Continental ceased operations in March 2012 as a result of its merger with United Airlines, Copa and United still use a similar "globe" logo design, but the rest of their liveries are different.

Services

Business Class 
Business seats are available on all aircraft. Business Class passengers check in at separate counters and are given priority with boarding and baggage handling, access to the Copa/United Club and other airline lounges, and bonus miles for the Copa ConnectMiles program. In-flight service includes pre-departure beverages, multi-course meals, and pillows and blankets (depending on the type and duration of the flight) on all international flights. Business Class also either equipped with reclinable leather seats with footrests and adjustable headrest or a lie-flat bed product on their 737MAX fleet which also includes a 120V power outlet, a large tray table, a USB port, and personal Audio-Video-on-Demand (AVOD) screen.

Special configuration of Copa Airlines' 737 MAX-9
Copa Airlines' Boeing 737 MAX-9 aircraft provide special benefits designed to offer more comfort and convenience during the flight, such as the exclusive Dreams Business Class, which has 16 flat beds and state-of-the-art 16-inch touch screens.

Economy Class 
Economy seats are available on all aircraft. Economy seats on brand-new Boeing 737-800s feature an adjustable headrest and a personal AVOD with a 5-inch (13 cm) touch screen, while older 737-800s provide entertainment on flip down screens above the seats. All Boeing 737 are also equipped with a radio antenna, which allows passengers to listen a wide list of songs and instrumentals from twelve channels. Food and snacks are available on domestic, short, and some medium-haul international flights. Full meals are complimentary on all other medium and long-haul international flights. Alcoholic drinks are complimentary for economy passengers on all flights.

Additionally, the main cabin has 24 Economy Extra seats, with more space, more entertainment options, and more comfort. Also, the Main Cabin has USB ports at each seat and larger overhead bins.

ConnectMiles 

ConnectMiles is Copa Airlines' frequent flyer program, offering frequent travelers the ability to purchase tickets with miles. Customers accrue miles from flight segments flown on Copa Airlines, United Airlines, and other Star Alliance member airlines. Benefits of Premier status include priority check-in, priority boarding, complimentary upgrades, and discounted airport lounge memberships (United Club/Copa Club). Due to the Continental-United merger, Copa Airlines phased out the OnePass frequent flyer program on December 31, 2011, and adopted the MileagePlus program on March 3, 2012.

In March 2015, Copa Airlines announced that it would phase out the MileagePlus program in favor of a new frequent flyer program called ConnectMiles. The new program was fully implemented on July 1, 2015.

Copa Club 
Copa Club is the membership airport lounge program of Copa Airlines jointly operated with United Airlines. Copa Club lounge is located in its hub at Tocumen International Airport, Panama City, Panama. The lounges offer amenities for travelers and members also have access to affiliated lounges around the world. The Copa Club locations in Central America and the Caribbean includes:

Incidents and accidents 
During its history, Copa Airlines had the following incidents and accidents:

Hijackings
Since its foundation in 1947, Copa Airlines has suffered one hijacking attempt:

 On 7 August 1994, a hijacking attempt occurred on board a Copa flight from Panama City to Guatemala City. Then it was reported as a misunderstanding by Panamanian authorities.

References

External links

 

 
Airlines established in 1944
Airlines of Panama
Latin American and Caribbean Air Transport Association
Companies based in Panama City
Star Alliance
Former SkyTeam members
Panamanian brands